The 1984 Atlantic 10 men's basketball tournament was held in Morgantown, West Virginia at WVU Coliseum from March 7–10, 1984. West Virginia defeated St. Bonaventure 59-56 to win their second tournament championship. Lester Rowe of West Virginia was named the Most Outstanding Player of the tournament.

Bracket

External links
  Atlantic 10 Men's Basketball Tournament History 

Atlantic 10 men's basketball tournament
Tournament
Atlantic 10 men's basketball tournament
Atlantic 10 men's basketball tournament